Huang Chung may refer to:

Wang Chung (band), British New Wave musical group
Huang Chung (album), album of the band Huang Chung
Huang Chong, or Huang Ch'ung in Wade–Giles, Chinese officer of the Three Kingdoms Period
Huang Zhong (died 220), or Huang Chung in Wade–Giles, leading military general of the Kingdom of Shu